The One Hundred Twenty-fourth Ohio General Assembly was the legislative body of the state of Ohio in 2001 and 2002. In this General Assembly, both the Ohio Senate and the Ohio House of Representatives were controlled by the Republican Party.  In the Senate, there were 21 Republicans and 12 Democrats. In the House, there were 60 Republicans and 39 Democrats. It was also the last General Assembly to use redistricted legislative districts after the 1990 United States Census.

Major events

Vacancies
January 16, 2001: Senator Roy Ray (R-27th) resigns.
February 5, 2001: Representative Kevin Coughlin (R-46th) resigns to take a seat in the Ohio Senate.
September 18, 2001: Senator Bruce Johnson (R-3rd) resigns to become Director of Development in the cabinet of Governor Bob Taft.
October 2, 2001: Representative David Goodman (R-25th) resigns to become a member of the Ohio Senate.
October 17, 2001: Representative Dan Metelsky (D-61) resigns to become Deputy Director of the Ohio Lottery.
December 5, 2001: Senator Rhine McLin (D-5th) resigns to become Mayor of Dayton, Ohio.
December 31, 2001: Representative Jack Ford (D-49th) resigns to become Mayor of Toledo, Ohio.
February 9, 2002: Representative Peter Lawson Jones (D-11th) resigns to become a Cuyahoga County, Ohio Commissioner
February 13, 2002: Representative John E. Barnes Jr. (D-12th) resigns to become Director of Community Relations for Cleveland, Ohio.
December 19, 2002: Senator Tim Ryan (D-32nd) resigns due to his election to the United States House of Representatives.
December 31, 2002: Senator Priscilla D. Mead (R-16th) resigns.

Appointments
February 6, 2001: Kevin Coughlin appointed to the 27th Senatorial District due to the resignation of Roy Ray.
February 12, 2001: John Widowfield appointed to the 46th House District due to the resignation of Kevin Coughlin.
October 2, 2001: David Goodman appointed to the 3rd Senatorial District due to the resignation of Bruce Johnson.
October 10, 2001: Jim McGregor appointed to the 25th House District due to the resignation of David Goodman.
October 30, 2001: Joseph Koziura appointed to the 61st House District due to the resignation of Dan Metelsky.
January 8, 2002: Edna Brown appointed to the 49th House District due to the resignation of Jack Ford.
January 9, 2002: Tom Roberts appointed to the 5th Senatorial District due to the resignation of Rhine McLin.
February 13, 2002: Michael DeBose appointed to the 12th House District due to the resignation of John E. Barnes Jr.
February 20, 2002: Lance Mason appointed to the 11th House District due to the resignation of Peter Lawson Jones.

Senate

Leadership

Majority leadership
 President of the Senate: Richard Finan
 President pro tempore of the Senate: Bruce Johnson
 Assistant pro tempore: Jay Hottinger
 Whip: Randy Gardner

Minority leadership
 Leader: Leigh Herington
 Assistant Leader: Greg DiDonato
 Whip: Dan Brady
 Assistant Whip: Mark Mallory

Members of the 124th Ohio Senate

House of Representatives

Leadership

Majority leadership
 Speaker of the House: Larry Householder
 President pro tempore of the Senate: Gary Cates
 Floor Leader: Patricia Clancy
 Assistant Majority Floor Leader: Steve Buehrer
 Majority Whip: Jim Trakas
 Assistant Majority Whip: Jon Peterson

Minority leadership
 Leader: Jack Ford
 Assistant Leader: Charlie Wilson
 Whip: Erin Sullivan
 Assistant Whip: Dale Miller

Members of the 124th Ohio House of Representatives

Appt.- Member was appointed to current House Seat

See also
Ohio House of Representatives membership, 126th General Assembly
Ohio House of Representatives membership, 125th General Assembly

References
Ohio House of Representatives, official website
Project Vote Smart – State House of Ohio
Map of Ohio House Districts
Ohio District Maps 2002–2012
Ohio House of Representatives: November 7, 2000 Ohio Secretary of State
Ohio Senate: November 7, 2000 Ohio Secretary of State

Ohio legislative sessions
2001 in Ohio
2002 in Ohio
Ohio
Ohio